Kathy Hogan (born February 1, 1948) is a Democratic-NPL politician in North Dakota. She is a member of the North Dakota Senate, representing the 21st District since 2018. She also represented the district in the North Dakota House of Representatives, serving from 2009 to 2018. In 2018, she announced she would give up her House seat to run to represent the same district in the North Dakota Senate, which she won in November.

References

1948 births
21st-century American politicians
21st-century American women politicians
Democratic Party members of the North Dakota House of Representatives
Democratic Party North Dakota state senators
Living people
People from Brainerd, Minnesota
Women state legislators in North Dakota